Tetrapolis (meaning "four cities") may refer to:

Tetrapolis (Attica), a district comprising four cities in ancient Attica, Greece
Doric Tetrapolis, a group of four cities in ancient Doris, Greece
Syrian Tetrapolis, a region of the Seleucid Empire
Antioch by itself was also sometimes called Tetrapolis
 Kibyran Tetrapolis in Lycia, see Kibyra